Fen Causeway or the Fen Road is the modern name for a Roman road of England that runs between Denver, Norfolk in the east and Peterborough in the west. It provided a link from the north and west of England to East Anglia.

It is possible that the route continued east of Denver to meet Peddars Way at Castle Acre, but the evidence for this is less certain.

Towards its western end it is close to the Bronze Age route across Flag Fen. At that archaeological site, which is open to visitors, a section through the Roman Road can be seen.

References

Roads in Cambridgeshire
History of Cambridgeshire
Roman roads in England
Archaeological sites in Cambridgeshire
Archaeological sites in Norfolk